Rongga is a language of central Flores, in East Nusa Tenggara Province, Indonesia. Rongga is closely related to Ngadha, and more distantly to Manggarai.

Locally, it is considered part of the Manggarai culture; however, its closer linguistic relatives include Ngadha and Lio, both belonging to the Central Flores subgroup. Typologically, it is an isolating language. Like other Central Flores languages, it uses elements of a base-5 numeral system, possibly exhibiting the influence of a hypothetical Papuan linguistic substratum.

When written, it is spelled with Indonesian-like orthographic conventions. Digraphs such as zh, dh and bh are used to record sounds specific to this language.

References

Bibliography 
 

Sumba languages
Languages of Indonesia